Jerry Meafou (born 22 April 1982 in Saleimoa) is a Samoan rugby union centre. He is a member of the Samoa national rugby union team and participated with the squad at the 2007 Rugby World Cup.

References

1982 births
Living people
Rugby union centres
Samoan rugby union players
Samoa international rugby union players